Verissimo may refer to:
 Veríssimo, a Brazilian municipality in the state of Minas Gerais
 Veríssimo River, a river in Brazil
 Verissimo (TV series), an Italian entertainment news program

People with the surname
 Fábio Jardel Veríssimo Lopes, Portuguese football player
 Joaquim Veríssimo Serrão, Portuguese historian
 Azumir Veríssimo, Brazilian former football player
 Dany Verissimo, French actress and model
 Erico Verissimo, Brazilian author
 José Veríssimo, Brazilian writer and educator
 Lucas Veríssimo, Brazilian football player
 Luis Fernando Verissimo, Brazilian author
 Nélson Veríssimo, Portuguese former football player
 Renato Verissimo, Brazilian martial artist